Adrian of Orléans (born c. 755died before November 821) was a Frankish count, son of Gerold of Vinzgau and Emma of Alemannia. His sister Hildegard of Vinzgouw married Charlemagne; therefore, he was the emperor's brother-in-law and uncle to the next emperor, Louis the Pious.

Family
He married Waldrada, who may have been a daughter of Wilhelmid Adalhelm of Autun, and had issue:

Odo I, Count of Orleans (d. aft. 15 Feb 834), who married Engeltrude of Fézensac, daughter of Count Leuthard I of Paris.
Waldrada who married Robert III of Worms (d. 834), count of the Oberrheingau and the Wormsgau, father of Robert the Strong.

References

Sources

Medieval French nobility
Udalriching dynasty
Adrian
750s births
9th-century deaths
Year of birth uncertain

Year of death unknown